Raymond Gabriel O'Rourke  (born January 1947) is an Irish businessman, the chairman and CEO of the construction multinational Laing O'Rourke.

O'Rourke was born in January 1947. A native of County Leitrim, Ireland, he runs the privately owned Laing O'Rourke with his brother Des (born 1950), and owns 55% of the company. O'Rourke "started as a 'pony boy' carrying muck out from under London as the Victoria Line was being constructed." His estimated net worth was €800 million as of 2015.

He has honorary doctorates from the Dublin Institute of Technology, and Queen's University, Belfast.

O'Rourke purchased the construction company Swift Structures, owned by his brothers-in-law, Jim and Matt Halligan from County Mayo. He then called in the receivers.

His son, Cathal, works for Laing O'Rourke, and in March 2023 was appointed the company's chief operating officer.

References

1947 births
Living people
Irish businesspeople
County Leitrim
Honorary Knights Commander of the Order of the British Empire
Date of birth missing (living people)
People from County Leitrim